Kalkaleh is a village in Silakhor-e Sharqi Rural District, in the Central District of Azna County, Lorestan Province, Iran. At the 2006 census, its population was 939, in 210 families.

References 

Towns and villages in Azna County